This is a list of yearly Wisconsin Intercollegiate Athletic Conference football standings.

Wisconsin Intercollegiate Athletic Conference standings

Early history

Modern era

References

 

Wisconsin Intercollegiate Athletic Conference
Standings